Marco Grimm (born 16 June 1972) is a German former professional footballer played as a defender. He spent four seasons in the Bundesliga with Bayern Munich and VfB Stuttgart, as well as five seasons in the 2. Bundesliga with Karlsruher SC and Eintracht Braunschweig. He also played for one season in the Austrian Bundesliga, with Grazer AK.

Career
Grimm was born in Baden-Baden. He began his career with VfB Gaggenau, before joining Bayern Munich in 1993, as a reserve team player. He made his debut for the first-team in April 1995, as a substitute for Thomas Helmer in the UEFA Champions League semi-final against Ajax. His one Bundesliga appearance for the club came ten days later – again replacing Helmer in a match against Eintracht Frankfurt which Bayern won 5–2, but was awarded to Frankfurt as Grimm was one of four reserve players used by Bayern, more than the maximum of three.

In 1995, Grimm joined VfB Stuttgart, where he made 21 Bundesliga appearances in his first season, mostly as a substitute. He made eleven league appearances the following year, plus four on the way to a DFB-Pokal win, although he didn't play in the final. He didn't play at all during the 1997–98 season, and in July 1998 signed for Austrian side Grazer AK, managed by former Bayern Munich coach Klaus Augenthaler.

Grimm had a fairly successful season in Austria, as GAK finished third in the league, before he returned to Germany in 1999, to sign for Karlsruher SC of the 2. Bundesliga. Karlsruhe were relegated in Grimm's first season, but he helped them win the Regionalliga Süd title and return to the second tier at the first attempt, where he played for a further two seasons before leaving the club in 2003.

Grimm then signed for Eintracht Braunschweig of the Regionalliga Nord, helping them win the title in his second season. He stayed with the club for two years in the 2. Bundesliga, the latter of which saw the club relegated in last place. In July 2007, he signed for 1. FC Kaiserslautern II, where he played for two seasons before becoming the team's assistant manager.

Honours
VfB Stuttgart
 UEFA Cup Winners' Cup runner-up: 1997–98
 DFB-Pokal: 1996–97

References

External links
 

Living people
1972 births
People from Baden-Baden
Sportspeople from Karlsruhe (region)
Footballers from Baden-Württemberg
German footballers
Association football defenders
FC Bayern Munich footballers
FC Bayern Munich II players
VfB Stuttgart players
Grazer AK players
Karlsruher SC players
Eintracht Braunschweig players
1. FC Kaiserslautern II players
Bundesliga players
2. Bundesliga players
Austrian Football Bundesliga players
Expatriate footballers in Austria
German expatriate footballers
German expatriate sportspeople in Austria